Cyrtinus hubbardi is a species of beetle in the family Cerambycidae. It was described by Fisher in 1926. It is known from Montserrat, Martinique, and Guadeloupe. It feeds on Ice cream bean.

References

Cyrtinini
Beetles described in 1926